Czechtalent Zlín (was known as Zlín Talent) is a national musical festival held in the town of Zlín in the Czech Republic, featuring young up-and-coming singers and composers. It is an annual event held in July, and was first held in May 1996 with Boney M and Peter Nagy appearing as guests.

References 
 Czechtalent Zlín pages

Music festivals in the Czech Republic
July events
Recurring events established in 1996